The Panchathan Record Inn and AM Studios is composer/music director A. R. Rahman's studios on his street at Kodambakkam, Chennai in Tamil Nadu.

History 
The Inn was established in 1989, attached to Rahman's backyard, and developed into one of the most developed studios in Asia. Located very close to his home, it houses equipment like the Euphonix System 5 Audio Mixing system. The studio has been designed by Studio 440 and the state of the art equipment is from Daxco Digital. His team includes acclaimed sound engineers of Chennai film music including the late H. Sridhar, Mani Sharma, S. Sivakumar, Aditya Modi, A. S. Laxmi Narayanan, S. Saisarvajith, J. Ravinder, his manager Noell James, and Co-Ordinator Samidurai.

In 2005, A. R. Rahman built a new studio associating with Mani Sharma, part of a redevelopment and extension project of the inn, called AM Studios. Mixing takes place at both the inn and the commercial A. M Studios for films. Other music directors use AM Studios for recording. Rahman also owns newly built KM Musiq Studios in Mumbai, London and Los Angeles where he has also mixed scores.

In 2013, AM Studios acquired a Barco Auro 11.1 system to enhance its 3D sound recording capabilities. The sound mixing for the Tamil film Maryan whose score was composed by A. R. Rahman himself.

Rahman's engineers
 H.Sreedhar-sound engineer
 Sivakumar - Sound engineer
 Suresh perumal - Sound engineer
 Karthik sekaran - Sound engineer
 Aravind Crescendo -Sound Engineer

References

A. R. Rahman
Recording studios in India